Wodonga TAFE Radio was an Australian radio station in Victoria. First broadcast in November 2005, it broadcast a rock music college radio format from the Wodonga Institute of TAFE to the surrounding Albury/Wodonga area. Complementing the institute's Diploma in Broadcasting, the station was staffed entirely by students undertaking the course. As of 2008, the station has fallen silent.

History
Wodonga TAFE first offered as pilot course in Broadcasting in 1998 through the Open Learning scheme, becoming fully accredited in April 2000.

In October 2003, Wodonga TAFE applied to the Australian Broadcasting Authority (ABA) for a broadcasting license. The application was rejected one month later, as no licenses were available. However, in May 2004 Wodonga TAFE appealed the ABA decision, and in June a frequency became available. In September 2004, the institute was awarded a narrowcast licence, broadcasting on 87.8 FM with 1 watt of power.

Test broadcasts began in March 2005, with the station's first official broadcast commencing in May. 87.8fm Wodonga TAFE Radio was launched in November 2005 by the president of the TAFE board, in the absence of then-Victorian Minister for Education, Lynne Kosky, whose visit to Wodonga was cancelled at the last minute due to a special cabinet meeting. The station's college radio format largely consisted of rock music, with news and talk content from students undertaking the course - a format chosen after surveying students and staff at the adjoining campuses of Wodonga TAFE and La Trobe University. Live broadcasts were largely constrained to Wednesday, Thursday and Friday afternoons for most of the TAFE year, with a full day of broadcasting during TAFE open days and a full week of programming in the second last week of November.

Before August 2007, the station suffered some issues with signal strength  due to another narrowcasting station setting up a transmitter covering the same frequency in Albury. As of August 2007, however, the station ceased transmission.

By 2008, Wodonga TAFE Radio fell silent. At the time, the station was the only in the region to broadcast media commentator and author Mike Carlton's Friday News Review, a satirical look at the week's national news stories. Many students who completed the course at Wodonga TAFE have gone on to gain roles at major regional and metropolitan stations around Australia.

References

External links
 Wodonga TAFE Radio Online
 Wodonga Institute of TAFE

TAFE Victoria
Student radio stations in Australia
Radio stations established in 2005
Radio stations disestablished in 2008
Radio stations in Victoria
Defunct radio stations in Australia
Wodonga